Euphorbia pedroi (known in Portuguese as eufórbia-de-gomes-pedro or tabaíba-do-espichel) is a species of flowering plant in the spurge family endemic to the Arrábida Natural Park in Portugal. It is part of section Aphyllis, a mostly African and Macaronesian clade, being the only member of its section native to Europe. Its binomial name is dedicated to José Gomes Pedro (1915-2010) a Portuguese botanist, who studied the flora and vegetation of Arrábida and Mozambique.

Description
Fruit is  yellowish-green or reddish, seeds are reddish brown,  and somewhat dorsiventrally flattened.

Distribution and habitat
Euphorbia pedroi is native to the Arrábida Natural Park, specifically between Cabo Espichel and Sesimbra on the Setúbal Peninsula, in the Atlantic coast. It is found on slopes of south-facing limestone cliffs on incipient soils or rock cracks subjected to regular mist and strong winds.

References

pedroi
Endemic flora of Portugal
Endemic flora of the Iberian Peninsula